Rajababu – The Power is a 2015 Bangladeshi action film directed by Badiul Alam Khokon. The film stars Shakib Khan, Apu Biswas and Bobby in lead roles. It is an unofficial remake of the 2012 Telugu movie Dammu. The film released on 24 September 2015 on 152 screens, which is the widest release of any Bangladeshi film up to that date.

Cast
 Shakib Khan – Rajababu 
 Apu Biswas – Sathi 
 Bobby – Sweety
 Misha Sawdagor – Diamond
 Uzzal
 Parveen Sultana Diti
 Prabir Mitra
 Omar Sani
 Shahnaz
 Subrata
 Siraj Haider
 Don
 Sadek Bachchu
 Shiba Shanu
 Zamilur Rahman Shakha
 Shahnoor

Soundtrack

Track listing

References

External links
 

2015 films
Bengali-language Bangladeshi films
Bangladeshi romantic drama films
Bangladeshi action films
Films scored by Ali Akram Shuvo
Films scored by Aryan Ashik
2010s Bengali-language films